Juan Josep González Fuentes (born 21 September 1972) is an Andorran former cyclist. He competed in the individual road race at the 1992 Summer Olympics.

Notes

References

External links
 
 
 

1972 births
Living people
Andorran male cyclists
Olympic cyclists of Andorra
Cyclists at the 1992 Summer Olympics
Place of birth missing (living people)